Merosargus anticus is a species of soldier fly in the family Stratiomyidae.

Distribution
Argentina, Costa Rica, Ecuador, Guatemala, Mexico, Peru, Venezuela.

References

Stratiomyidae
Insects described in 1932
Diptera of South America
Diptera of North America
Taxa named by Charles Howard Curran